Michael Otto (born 12 April 1943), is the chairman of the supervisory board of Germany's Otto Group, one of world's largest mail order company, with €15.6 billion in 2021.

Early life
He earned doctorates from the University of Hamburg and the University of Munich.

Career
Otto Group was founded by his father, the late Werner Otto, as a mail-order business in Hamburg in 1949.

They were the former owners of Spiegel, Inc. (the parent company of Eddie Bauer and former owners of Spiegel catalog), which filed for bankruptcy on 17 March 2003. On 25 May 2005, Spiegel, Inc. emerged from bankruptcy, was renamed Eddie Bauer Holdings, and is now owned primarily by Commerzbank. The Otto Group no longer has any stake in the company.

Otto and his family own extensive real estate in Canada and in the United States, shopping centers in Germany and part of home-furnishings chain Crate & Barrel. Known as a committed environmentalist, his company has long touted environmentally safe products. In 1993, he created the Michael Otto Foundation (German: Michael Otto Stiftung). This foundation played, and is still playing, an important role in furthering multi-stakeholder dialogue on hot environmental issues. Otto is also a member of the World Future Council.

Otto is president of the Foundation 2°, which promotes a transition towards a carbon-free economic system. He once stated about this transition: "Understanding climate protection as a modernisation project for the economy can now play an important role in overcoming the consequences of the Corona crisis – and at the same time help to avoid profound negative impacts of the climate crisis."

Personal life
Otto is married, with two children, and lives in Hamburg, Germany.

References

External links
 Michael Otto Foundation

Living people
1943 births
20th-century German businesspeople
21st-century German businesspeople
German billionaires
German businesspeople in retailing
German environmentalists
Knights Commander of the Order of Merit of the Federal Republic of Germany
Otto family
People from Chełmno
People from West Prussia
University of Hamburg alumni
Ludwig Maximilian University of Munich alumni